Île-de-France Mobilités (ÎDF Mobilités), formerly STIF, is the brand name of the Syndicat des transports d'Île-de-France, the organisation authority that controls and coordinates the different transport companies operating in the Paris-area public transport network and rest of Île-de-France region. ÎDF Mobilités was created in 1959 and, since 2005, is a public establishment. It coordinates the operation of RATP Group, SNCF Transilien and the nearly 90 Optile-affiliated private bus companies. ÎDF Mobilités has real autonomy and, since 2005, is not dependent on the French Government.

In June 2017, Valérie Pécresse, President of the Île-de-France region and of the STIF, announced that the authority would change its public name to Île-de-France Mobilités.

References

External links 
 Official website of ÎDF mobilités 

Transport in Île-de-France
Public transport operators in France